Kleindienst v. Mandel, 408 U.S. 753 (1972), was a decision by the United States Supreme Court, which held that the United States Attorney General has the right to refuse somebody's entry to the United States, as he has been empowered to do so in § 212(a)(28) of the Immigration and Nationality Act of 1952.

This action was brought to compel Attorney General Richard Kleindienst to grant a temporary nonimmigrant visa to a Belgian journalist and Marxian theoretician whom the American plaintiff-appellees, Ernest Mandel et al., had invited to participate in academic conferences and discussions in the US. The alien had been found ineligible for admission under §§ 212(a)(28)(D) and (G)(v) of the Immigration and Nationality Act of 1952, barring those who advocate or publish "the economic, international, and governmental doctrines of world communism." Kleindienst had declined to waive ineligibility as he has the power to do under § 212(d) of the Act, basing his decision on unscheduled activities engaged in by the alien on a previous visit to the United States, when a waiver was granted.

Impact 
Kleindienst v. Mandel was cited by the 9th Circuit three-judge appeals panel on February 9, 2017, in Washington v. Trump, with regard to an executive order concerning the restriction of immigration from certain stipulated countries. In that case the government relied on language from Mandel that embraces the proposition that "when the Executive exercises immigration authority 'on the basis of a facially legitimate and bona fide reason, the courts will [not] look behind the exercise of that discretion.'" The court instead held that the Mandel Standard involved a "congressionally enumerated standard" and its application to an individual visa application rather than what it considered to be the "President's promulgation of sweeping immigration policy". They concluded that "courts can and do review constitutional challenges to the substance and implementation of immigration policy."

The Supreme Court later relied in part on Kleindienst v. Mandel in upholding the Trump immigration restriction in Trump v. Hawaii (2018), overruling the 9th Circuit.

See also
List of United States Supreme Court cases, volume 408

References

Further reading

External links
 

United States Supreme Court cases
United States Supreme Court cases of the Burger Court
United States Free Speech Clause case law
United States immigration and naturalization case law
1972 in United States case law
Belgium–United States relations
Anti-communism in the United States